The 2016–17 Fordham Rams men's basketball team represented Fordham University during the 2016–17 NCAA Division I men's basketball season. The Rams, led by second-year head coach Jeff Neubauer, played their home games at Rose Hill Gymnasium in The Bronx, New York as a member of the Atlantic 10 Conference. They finished the season 13–19, 7–11 in A-10 play to finish in tenth place. They received the No. 10 seed in the A-10 tournament where they lost in the second round to George Mason.

Previous season
The Rams finished the 2015–16 season 17–14, 8–10 in A-10 play to finish in eighth place. They lost in the second round of the A-10 tournament to Richmond. They were invited to the CollegeInsdier.com Tournament where they lost in the first round to Boston University.

Offseason

Departures

Incoming transfers

2016 recruiting class

Preseason 
Fordham was picked to finish in 11th place in the preseason A-10 poll.

Roster

Schedule and results

|-
!colspan=9 style=| Non-conference regular season

|-
!colspan=9 style=| Atlantic 10 regular season

|-
!colspan=9 style=| Atlantic 10 tournament

See also
2016–17 Fordham Rams women's basketball team

References

Fordham
Fordham Rams men's basketball seasons
Fordham
Fordham